The United Nations University Institute for Sustainability and Peace (UNU-ISP) was an institute of the United Nations University (UNU), a think tank for the United Nations system which provides a bridge between the UN and the international academic and policy-making communities. UNU-ISP is based at UNU headquarters in Tokyo, Japan, with an Operating Unit located in Germany (UNU-ISP SCYCLE).

UNU-ISP seeks to achieve and promote a better understanding of three of the most pressing issues on the UN agenda: global change, peace and security, and development. With an innovative approach to sustainability, the work of the institute bridges these cross-cutting themes through research, educational and collaborative initiatives with the aim of solving current problems and anticipating future challenges.

Overview 
As an institute of the United Nations University, UNU-ISP is bound by the UNU Charter, and guidelines set out by the UNU Council.
UNU-ISP works in collaboration with other UNU institutes and programs, as well as through collaborative relationships with the global academic and policy-making communities.
Within the context of sustainability and peace, UNU-ISP:
 Conducts research; undertakes education, training and capacity development; and facilitates the dissemination of scientific knowledge and information to the United Nations and its agencies, to scholars and to the public.
 Provides opportunities for postgraduate students and professionals to obtain a wider understanding of relevant issues.
 Integrates the natural sciences, social sciences and humanities into a transdisciplinary approach that contributes to the development and strengthening of policy frameworks and management actions at all levels.
UNU-ISP offers a postgraduate program, the Master of Science in Sustainability, Development, and Peace. This two-year program addresses pressing global issues through an innovative interdisciplinary approach that integrates the natural sciences, social sciences, and humanities.

History 

UNU-ISP became operational on 1st January, 2009 to give an institutional identity and profile to the integrated academic activities of two former UNU programs: the Environment and Sustainable Development program, and the Peace and Governance program. The institute combines the strengths in natural sciences, social sciences and the humanities of these two former programs, and creates trans-disciplinary synergies that can more effectively address pressing global problems of human survival, development and welfare.

Research 
In line with the UNU Charter, the research of UNU-ISP addresses "global problems of human survival, development and welfare that are the concern of the United Nations and its agencies". UNU-ISP applies innovative, holistic approaches to identify sustainable solutions to such problems, cross-fertilizing natural science and social science methodologies through teams working on institute-wide, cross-cutting themes.
The institute conducts policy-relevant research into the following three thematic areas, while integrating overarching elements such as ecological security, human rights, gender, and governance:

Global Change & Sustainability 
The global change and sustainability focus of UNU-ISP seeks to clarify our understanding of sustainable development and the interaction among its constituent components – environment, society and economy.

Peace & Security 
UNU-ISP develops research addressing threats to peace such as violent conflicts, human rights abuses, organized crime, the spread of diseases, the proliferation of weapons and terrorism.

International Cooperation & Development 
UNU-ISP develops research addressing underdevelopment; underrepresentation in decision-making; economic and social inequalities both within and between states; and insufficient access to resources, healthcare, education, science and technology.

Postgraduate programs

Master of Science (MSc) in Sustainability, Development, and Peace 

UNU-ISP offers this Master of Science (MSc) degree, intended for recent graduates, professionals and practitioners interested in the unique opportunity of studying at a global university within the framework of the United Nations.

The program addresses pressing global issues of sustainability, climate change, development, peacebuilding and human rights through an innovative interdisciplinary approach that integrates the natural sciences, social sciences, and humanities. It provides students with the knowledge and skills to make important contributions towards solving global issues, whether through employment by UN agencies, other international organizations, governments, civil society, or the private sector.

A practically oriented, user-focused program of the highest academic quality, it offers opportunities to gain practical experience through internships or field research with a UN agency or other international organization. The programme builds on UNU's strong record in training and capacity development, and utilizes the extensive network of scholars and academic institutions participating in UNU research.

Capacity Development 

UNU-ISP has a strong commitment to capacity development, with a particular focus on enhancing the capacity of individuals and institutions in developing countries.

UNU International Courses 
Every year UNU-ISP organizes the regular session of its six-week UNU International Courses (UNU-IC) at UNU headquarters in Tokyo, Japan. The UNU-IC program is designed for postgraduate students and young professionals (with a college or university degree) in various occupations in Japan and abroad who wish to pursue careers in international fields in public-service or private organizations, including the United Nations, multinational corporations and non-governmental organizations as well as national foreign service organizations. The courses are designed to provide analyses of global issues from both theoretical and empirical perspectives.

Global Seminar Series 
The aim of the UNU Global Seminars is to enhance awareness about contemporary global issues and the role of the United Nations in addressing those issues. Students and young professionals are given the opportunity to interact with distinguished scholars and practitioners from Japan and abroad, and to explore a specific issue in depth through lectures and group discussions. These sessions are open to university students, graduate students and young professionals.

References

External links 
 United Nations University Institute for Sustainability and Peace (UNU-ISP) website
 United Nations University headquarters website

 
International sustainability organizations
Environmental social science
Peace and conflict studies